The 2018–19 World Boxing Super Series – bantamweight division is a World Boxing Super Series professional boxing tournament took place between October 2018 and November 2019 in several countries. The Super Series features 8 top-rated bantamweight boxers in a single-elimination tournament. The tournament was organized by Comosa AG.

Participants 

 Paul Butler is a tournament reserve fighter.

Brackets
Source:
{{3RoundBracket-Byes
| seeds=no
| RD1=Quarter-finals
| RD2=Semi-finals
| RD3=Final

| team-width=220
| score-width=60

| RD1-team1=
| RD1-score1=
| RD1-team2=
| RD1-score2=RTD 4

| RD1-team3=
| RD1-score3=UD 12
| RD1-team4=
| RD1-score4=

| RD1-team5= 
| RD1-score5= KO 1
| RD1-team6=
| RD1-score6=

| RD1-team7= 
| RD1-score7=SD 12
| RD1-team8=
| RD1-score8=

| RD2-team1=
* Zolani Tete withdrew from the semi-final due to an injury and was replaced by Stephon Young.

Quarter-finals 
The quarterfinals are held from 7 October to 3 November 2018.

Semi-finals 
The semifinals will be held in 27 April and 18 May 2019.

Final 
For WBA (Super), IBF, and The Ring titles.

References 

World Boxing Super Series
World Boxing Super Series
World Boxing Super Series